= Gertrude H. Lamb =

Gertrude H. Lamb (1918–2015) was a librarian. She is often credited with the creation of clinical medical librarianship, a practice in which a medical librarian participates in hospital rounds with the purpose of assisting medical professionals with information needs on specific cases. Born in Montana, she eventually became a librarian as a second career after teaching at the University of Connecticut.
